HMS Endeavour was a 4-gun cutter of the Royal Navy, commissioned in 1763 and used for coastal patrol duties off Beachy Head in southern England. Endeavour was sold out of service in 1771.

References

Bibliography
 

Cutters of the Royal Navy
1760s ships